In the mathematical field of graph theory, a half-transitive graph is a graph that is both vertex-transitive and edge-transitive, but not symmetric.  In other words, a graph is half-transitive if its automorphism group acts transitively upon both its vertices and its edges, but not on ordered pairs of linked vertices.

Every connected symmetric graph must be vertex-transitive and edge-transitive, and the converse is true for graphs of odd degree, so that half-transitive graphs of odd degree do not exist.  However, there do exist half-transitive graphs of even degree. The smallest half-transitive graph is the Holt graph, with degree 4 and 27 vertices.

References

Graph families
Algebraic graph theory
Regular graphs